Fothad II was the bishop of St Andrews (1059–1093) for most of the reign of King Máel Coluim III mac Donnchada (reigned 1058–1093). Alternative spellings include Fodhoch, Fothach and Foderoch,  and Fothawch (by Andrew of Wyntoun). A "Modach filius Malmykel" is mentioned in a grant, dated 1093, as the bishop of S. Andrews. As this bishop is certainly Fothad II, his father was a man named Máel Míchéil.

According to Andrew of Wyntoun, Fothad performed the marriage ceremony between King Máel Coluim and the woman who would be his second wife, Margaret. An early 12th-century cleric of York claimed that Fothad, on the instructions of Queen Margaret, had submitted to the Archbishop of York, although modern historians are usually inclined to doubt this.

He was influential enough for his death in 1093 to be noticed by the Annals of Ulster, which calls him "Fothud ardepscop Alban" (i.e. "Fothad, High Bishop [Archbishop?] of Scotland").

His immediate successor, according to the bishop list of Walter Bower, was Giric; but the next consecrated bishop we know about from other sources is Turgot. The obvious question is, did the bishopric really lie vacant for a decade and a half, did Bower or his source invent Giric, or did Giric actually succeed? The former options hardly seem probable in the context.

Notes

References
Anderson, Alan Orr, Early Sources of Scottish History: AD 500-1286, 2 Vols, (Edinburgh, 1922)
Anderson, Alan Orr, Scottish Annals from English Chroniclers: AD 500-1286, (London, 1908), republished, Marjorie Anderson (ed.) (Stamford, 1991)
Anderson, Marjorie Ogilvie, "St. Andrews before Alexander I", in G.W.S. Barrow (ed.), The Scottish Tradition, (Edinburgh, 1994), pp. 1–13
Bannerman, John, "MacDuff of Fife," in A. Grant & K.Stringer (eds.) Medieval Scotland: Crown, Lordship and Community, Essays Presented to G.W.S. Barrow,  (Edinburgh, 1993), pp. 20–38
Barrow, G.W.S., "The Clergy of St. Andrews", in The Kingdom of the Scots, 2nd Ed., (Edinburgh, 2003), pp. 187–202
Lawrie, Sir Archibald, Early Scottish Charters Prior to A.D. 1153, (Glasgow, 1905)
MacQueen, John, MacQueen, Winifred & Watt, D.E.R. (eds.), Scottichronicon by Walter Bower in Latin and English, Vol. 3, (Aberdeen, 1995)

External links
Annals of Ulster s.a. 1093
English Translation

11th-century births
1093 deaths
Bishops of St Andrews
Medieval Gaels from Scotland
11th-century Scottish Roman Catholic bishops